The 2011 NCAA Division I Tennis Championships were the 65th annual men's and 29th annual women's championships to determine the national champions of NCAA Division I men's and women's singles, doubles, and team collegiate tennis in the United States. The tournaments were played concurrently during May 2011.

Three-time champion USC defeated Virginia in the men's championship, 4–3, to claim the Trojans' then-record nineteenth team national title.

Florida defeated defending champions Stanford in the women's championship, 4–3, to claim the Gators' fifth team national title.

Host site
This year's tournaments were played at the Taube Tennis Center at Stanford University in Stanford, California.

See also
NCAA Division II Tennis Championships (Men, Women)
NCAA Division III Tennis Championships (Men, Women)

References

External links
List of NCAA Men's Tennis Champions
List of NCAA Women's Tennis Champions

NCAA Division I tennis championships
NCAA Division I Tennis Championships
NCAA Division I Tennis Championships
NCAA Division I Tennis Championships
Tennis in California